Zdenko Trebuľa (born on September 29, 1955 in Martin, Czechoslovakia) was the Mayor of the town of Košice (from 1999 to 2006), then the President of the Košice Self-governing Region (from January 2006 to December 2017).

He is a former lawyer, attorney. He is married with two children.

Trebuľa is a member of the political party Direction – Slovak Social Democracy (Smer). From 1979 to 1990 he was a member of the Communist Party of Czechoslovakia (KSČ).

References

1955 births
Living people
People from Martin, Slovakia
Slovak communists
Direction – Social Democracy politicians
Košice